Zheng Zeguang (born October 1963) is a Chinese diplomat currently serving as the Chinese Ambassador to the United Kingdom, and former Vice Minister of Foreign Affairs of China.

Career
After teaching at a Guangdong middle school from 1980 to 1982, Zheng studied at South China Normal University and Cardiff University. He joined the Ministry of Foreign Affairs in 1986 and has had placements in Trinidad and Tobago and the United States. Zheng is considered an expert on China–United States relations, having specialised in that field since 1990; he was thought to be a leading contender to be ambassador to the United States.

In September 2021, he was banned from the British Parliament while Chinese sanctions on MPs remain.

References

External links
 Biography from the Chinese Ministry of Foreign Affairs

See also
 Liu Xiaoming
 Embassy of China, London
 Ministry of Foreign Affairs of the People's Republic of China

1963 births
Living people
Alumni of Cardiff University
Ambassadors of China to the United Kingdom
Chinese diplomats